Charles Donaldson may refer to:

 Charles R. Donaldson (1919–1987), Idaho Supreme Court justice
 Charles Edward McArthur Donaldson (1903–1964), Scottish Unionist Party politician